Harald Georg Belker (born May 27, 1961, Krefeld) is a German entertainment/automotive/product designer best known for his vehicle designs in films such as Batman & Robin and Minority Report. His designs range from fantastic entertainment designs to ergonomic user-friendly product design.

He was educated at the Art Center College of Design in Automotive Design after graduating from Georgia Southern University in Industrial Technology. He received an honorary doctor's degree from Art Center.

Career 
Belker's career started in 1991 at Mercedes Benz Advanced Design in Irvine, California. As part of the team responsible for the Smart Car design, he went on to work independently, eventually ending up in entertainment design. Here he had his most significant success. He also explored furniture design, his Maxelle chair winning the excellent award, and he is responsible for the design of the line of sunglasses for Kaenon Polarized, a Newport Beach, California–based company, that focuses on fashionable but active lifestyle. He has published a couple of design books, Pulse, explaining his future vision for high-speed vehicle racing, and Ride, which showcases the design of a futuristic electric motorcycle. From 2012 to 2019 he was working for Anki as head of design, a robotics and artificial intelligence startup company whose headquarters is in San Francisco. He currently switches between Entertainment and Product design to keep him engaged and busy.

Filmography 
 Moonfall (2022) – Rover vehicle design, Shuttle design
 Edge of Tomorrow (2014) – flying vehicle designs, exoskeleton suit
 Star Trek Into Darkness (2013) – vehicle designs
 Oblivion (2013) – Motorcycle designs
 Total Recall (2012) – vehicle designs
 In Time (2011) – vehicle designs
 Battleship (2012) – design of ships and weapons
 Iron Man 2 (2010) – design and graphics for the race cars
 Tron: Legacy (2010) – early concepts on the Light Bike and design of the Guard Bikes
 Dragonball Evolution (2009) – design of weapons and vehicles
 Death Race (2008) – design of all the vehicle armor
 Iron Man (2008) – design of a car that was later scratched, alternative weapons for the suit
 Transformers (2007) – design of several background vehicles
 Spider-Man 3 (2006) – design of the Sky–Stick
XXX: State of the Union (2004) – re-design of the GTO and Mustang
 Zathura (2004) – Robot design and studio sketches for the At–Home, car designer
 Serenity (2004) – design of the Thug Attack Sled
 Constantine (2004) – Prop design
 Stealth (2003) – design of EDI and plane interior
 The Cat in the Hat (2002) – design of the S.L.O.W. Car
 XXX (2001) – design of the GTO
 Minority Report (2001) – design of the Maglev vehicles, futuristic transportation system and red Lexus sports car
 Superman (2001) – design of the alien space fleet
 Spider-Man (2000) – design of the Pumpkin Bomb and several other gadgets
 Battlefield Earth (2000) – design of the alien attack craft
 Fahrenheit 451 (1999) – design of the fire truck
 Inspector Gadget (1998) – design of the Gadgetmobile
 Deep Blue Sea (1998) – concept art
 Supernova (1997) – concept art
Armageddon (1997) – design of the X–71 Space Shuttle
 Batman & Robin (1996) – design of the Batmobile, Redbird motorcycle and all other vehicles

Other works
 Apple – Consumer Product Development.
 Samsung – Consumer Product Development.
 ANKI - Head Consumer Product Designer.
 Oblong – design for a gloveless hand devise for the g-speak interface.
 Shell – Hydrofuel station design proposal.
 Kaenon Polarized –  design for the complete line of sunglasses. 
 Solar Monkey, electric car design.
 Lee Iacocca – e-bike, first full electric bicycle.
 Studio Roundhouse – Hydrapak, hydration backpack line.
 Mattel Toys – Hot Wheels
 Gnomon workshop – five design tutorials, from concept to finished art work for automotive design.
 Digital Anvil – designs for all the ships of the Freelancer computer game. 
 Nissan Design International - design consultant for Quest show car.
 Mercedes Benz Advanced Design – worked on designs for the Smart car, M-class and S-class.
 Porsche Design Germany – design entry for the model 996.

Personal life
He resides in the coastal community of Mar Vista, outside Los Angeles with his wife Thanda Belker and their daughter Skye. In his free time he enjoys kitesurfing and snowboarding as well as spending time with his family.

References

1961 births
Georgia Southern University alumni
German automobile designers
Living people